Haldane Douglas (August 13, 1893 – May 26, 1980) was an American art director, painter, etcher, muralist and architect. He was nominated an Academy Award in the category Best Art Direction for the film For Whom the Bell Tolls. He was born in Pittsburgh, Pennsylvania and died in Orange County, California.

Selected filmography
 For Whom the Bell Tolls (1943)

References

External links

1893 births
1980 deaths
American art directors
Artists from Pittsburgh